This is a list of countries by plum and sloe production in 2016 and 2017, based on data from the Food and Agriculture Organization Corporate Statistical Database. The estimated total world production of plum and sloe for 2017 was 11,758,135 metric tonnes, down 1% from 11,875,874 tonnes in 2016. China was by far the largest producer, accounting for nearly 58% of global production.

Production by country

>100,000 tonnes

10,000–100,000 tonnes

1,000–10,000 tonnes

<1,000 tonnes

External links 
FAO complete list

Notes

References 

Lists of countries by production
List of countries by plum production
Plums
Plums